Dubourdieu is a French-language surname.  People with the name include:

Bernard Dubourdieu (1773–1811), French admiral
Denis Dubourdieu (1949-), French wine scientist and winemaker
Frédéric Dubourdieu (1879–?) early 20th century French olympic fencer
Isaac Dubourdieu (approx 1597-1700), French reformed minister
Jean Dubourdieu (approx 1642-1720), French Protestant minister
Dubourdieu (cyclist), French cyclist who competed in the 1900 Summer Olympics

French-language surnames